The 1990 UEFA European Under-18 Championship final tournament was held in Hungary. It also served as the European qualification for the 1991 FIFA World Youth Championship.

Teams

The following teams qualified for the tournament:

 
 
  (host, but still qualified)

Squads

Quarter-finals

Semifinals

Places 5-8

Places 1–4

Third place match

Final

Qualification to World Youth Championship
The six best performing teams qualified for the 1991 FIFA World Youth Championship.

 
  (host)

See also
 1990 UEFA European Under-18 Championship qualifying

External links
Results by RSSSF

UEFA European Under-19 Championship
1990
Under-18
Euro
July 1990 sports events in Europe
1990 in youth association football